Golf Course News International, more often referred to as GCNI, is a global bi-monthly golf trade publication based in Birmingham, UK.

In 2001, United Publications (Yarmouth, Maine) sold the title to Amenity Technologies (London).

References

Bi-monthly magazines published in the United Kingdom
Course News International
Magazines established in 1988
Mass media in Birmingham, West Midlands
Professional and trade magazines
Sports magazines published in the United Kingdom